Bila Krynytsia is an urban-type settlement in Beryslav Raion, Kherson Oblast, southern Ukraine. It is located in the steppe between the Inhulets and the Vysun rivers, mid-distance between Kherson and Kryvyi Rih. Bila Krynytsia belongs to Velyka Oleksandrivka settlement hromada, one of the hromadas of Ukraine. It has a population of

Administrative status 
Until 18 July, 2020, Bila Krynytsia belonged to Velyka Oleksandrivka Raion. The raion was abolished in July 2020 as part of the administrative reform of Ukraine, which reduced the number of raions of Kherson Oblast to five. The area of Velyka Oleksandrivka Raion was merged into Beryslav Raion.

Transportation 

2022 Russian Invasion 
At the beginning of the 2022 Russian invasion of Ukraine, Bila Krynytsia was occupied by Russian troops in their initial advance into Ukraine. The settlement was recaptured by Ukrainian forces sometime in early June, but became one of the new settlements on the frontline in doing so. This situation made it vulnerable to bombardment by Russian tanks, mortars, and artillery, where it was often attacked throughout July, August, and September. Bila Krynytsia and other nearby settlements were largely relieved of these attacks during Ukraine's southern counteroffensive on 3 October, which moved the frontline approximately 30km (20 miles) from where it previously was.

At 16:00 on 12 May, a 200 vehicle convoy of evacuating Ukrainian civilians from occupied territory in the Kherson region was struck by Russian artillery outside of the settlement, according to a telegram made by the head of Kryvyi Rih's military administration Oleksandr Vilkul. The attack injured several, including a child, who were treated for their injuries at a hospital in Kryvyi Rih.

See also 
 Russian occupation of Kherson Oblast

References 

Populated places established in 1914
Urban-type settlements in Beryslav Raion